America's Waterway Watch (AWW) is a program of the United States Coast Guard and its Reserve and Auxiliary components to encourage members of the public to be on the alert for suspicious behavior by boaters. As part of an effort to tighten security after the September 11 attacks of 2001, people involved in the maritime industry and recreational boating were encouraged by the Coast Guard to report suspicious activity to the National Response Center. In 2005, Coast Guard Commandant Thomas H. Collins issued Commandant Instruction 16618.8, formalizing the program as America's Waterway Watch.

Research conducted between 2010-2013 that compared marinas that had adopted AWW with marinas that did not found a decreased crime rate in adopting marinas.

References

External links
America's Waterway Watch on Homeport
America's Waterway Watch

Civil crime prevention
Law enforcement in the United States
United States Coast Guard